Callicerastis stagmatias is a fungus moth (family Tineidae) of the subfamily Erechthiinae.

It is provisionally separated in the monotypic genus Callicerastis, but it may belong in the related larger genus Erechthias.

References

Butterflies and Moths of the World - Generic Names and their Type-species
  (2010): Australian Faunal Directory – Erechthias. Version of 2010-NOV-15. Retrieved 2011-DEC-23.

Erechthiinae
Tineidae genera
Monotypic moth genera